Michaela Rink (born 21 March 1967) is a German sports shooter. She competed in the mixed skeet event at the 1988 Summer Olympics.

References

External links
 

1967 births
Living people
German female sport shooters
Olympic shooters of West Germany
Shooters at the 1988 Summer Olympics
Sportspeople from Wiesbaden